Rhodes Peak is a peak, 780 m, standing at the north side of the mouth of Hoffman Glacier, marking the seaward end of the ridge descending east from Mount Tripp, Holland Range. Named by Advisory Committee on Antarctic Names (US-ACAN) for Lieutenant Commander A.G. Rhodes, RNZN, commanding officer of HMNZS Pukaki, ocean station ship on duty between New Zealand and McMurdo Sound in 1964 and 1965.
 

Mountains of the Ross Dependency
Shackleton Coast